Juan Alonso de Cuevas y Dávalos (25 November 1590 – 2 September 1665) was a Catholic prelate who served as Archbishop of Mexico (1664–1665) and Bishop of Antequera, Oaxaca (1658–1664).

Biography
Juan Alonso de Cuevas y Dávalos was born in New Spain.
On 19 January 1658, he selected by the King of Spain and confirmed by Pope Alexander VII as Bishop of Antequera, Oaxaca. On 13 September 1658, he was consecrated bishop by Mateo de Sagade de Bugueyro, Archbishop of Mexico. On 28 April 1664, he was appointed by Pope Alexander VII as Archbishop of Mexico and installed on 15 November 1664. He served as Archbishop of Mexico until his death on 2 September 1665. While bishop, he was the principal consecrator of Marcos de Torres y Rueda, Bishop of Yucatán (1645).

See also 
Catholic Church in Mexico

References

External links and additional sources
 (for Chronology of Bishops) 
 (for Chronology of Bishops) 
 (for Chronology of Bishops)  
 (for Chronology of Bishops) 

1590 births
1665 deaths
17th-century Roman Catholic archbishops in Mexico
Roman Catholic archbishops of Mexico (city)
Bishops appointed by Pope Alexander VII
Mexican Roman Catholic archbishops